Andrew or Andy West may refer to:

 Andrew West (linguist) (born 1960), English linguist
 Andrew West (pianist) (born 1979), English pianist
 Andrew Fleming West (1853–1943),  American classicist and academic administrator
 Andrew J. West (born 1983), American actor
 Andy West (born 1953), American bass guitarist and composer
 Andy West (biologist), English-New Zealand biologist and academic administrator
 Andy West (Big Brother) (born c. 1982), British reality show participant